John O'Connor (19 August 1868 – 2 February 1952) was an Australian cricketer. He played two first-class cricket matches for Victoria between 1896 and 1897.

See also
 List of Victoria first-class cricketers

References

External links
 

1868 births
1952 deaths
Australian cricketers
Victoria cricketers
Cricketers from Geelong